Superdrome may refer to:

 Adelaide Super-Drome
 Challenge Stadium, previously the Superdrome
 Frisco Superdrome, velodrome in Frisco, Texas

See also
 Superdome (disambiguation)